Highly Prized Possession is the ninth studio album by Canadian country pop artist Anne Murray, released in November 1974.  In the U.S., the album peaked at number 8 on the country album charts and number 70 on the pop albums chart; in Canada, the album reached number 26.  Murray's cover of the Beatles' "Day Tripper" was released as a single (following her chart success the year before on another Beatles cover "You Won't See Me"), and it reached # 59 on the Hot 100, but failed to hit the U.S. Country chart.

Track listing

Chart performance

Production
Producer: Brian Ahern for Happy Sack Productions Ltd.
Executive Producer: Paul White
Arranger: Brian Ahern

References

1974 albums
Anne Murray albums
Capitol Records albums
Albums produced by Brian Ahern (producer)